All American Foods, Inc. (AAFI) is a food ingredient manufacturer, headquartered in Mankato, Minnesota.  AAFI operates four manufacturing facilities in Southern Minnesota that produce over 100 dairy and non-dairy food ingredients for human consumption. AAFI produces ingredients for bakery, confectionery, soups and sauce, and flavor applications. All American Foods also provides custom toll processing and packaging of food ingredients.

History
All American Foods was founded in 1987 by Jeff Thom in Mankato, Minnesota.  Today, its 14 acre Mankato, MN campus includes three state-of-the-art manufacturing facilities.  In 2000, All American acquired Waseca Foods, which expanded their capacity and processing capabilities. Today, its Pro Mix line of value added food ingredients are used nationwide in a variety of applications.

Leadership Team
Founder/CEO – Jeff Thom
President – Connie Stokman
Finance Director – Kevin Olson
Quality Assurance Director – Shawn Stoley
Research and Development Director – Tyler Snitker
National Sales Director – Amy Kuch
Project Development Director – John Byers

In the news
In 2008, Jeff Thom, CEO of All American Foods, Inc. was named Business Person of the Year by Connect Magazine.

See also

List of food companies

References

Companies based in Minnesota
Food and drink companies of the United States
Mankato, Minnesota